Richard Moguena, born 1 September 1986, is a Chadian professional basketball player.  He currently plays for the AS Africana of the D1 Chad.

He represented Chad's national basketball team at the 2011 FIBA Africa Championship in Antananarivo, Madagascar, where he was his team's best rebounder and free throw shooter.

References

External links
 Real GM Profile
 Africabasket.com Profile

1986 births
Living people
Chadian men's basketball players
People from N'Djamena
Small forwards